Nephele rectangulata is a moth of the family Sphingidae. It is known from forests from Sierra Leone to Congo and Uganda.

References

Nephele (moth)
Moths described in 1895
Moths of Africa
Insects of Uganda
Fauna of the Central African Republic
Fauna of the Republic of the Congo
Fauna of Gabon